El Parque Diversiones Dr. Roberto Ortiz Brenes (also known as Parque Diversiones or “fun park”) is an amusement park located in San José, Costa Rica. The park's motto is "healthy children help sick children". The park was named for Dr. Brenes, whose proposal for a theme park resulted in the park’s creation. His mission was that the profits from the park would go to support the Dr. Carlos Saenz Herrera National Children's Hospital (Hospital Nacional de Niños, San Juan), established in 1964. The amusement park began operating at the end of 1981.

Among other attractions, the amusement park has four roller coasters:
Bocaraca (completed 2005), a Vekoma Whirlwind-model coaster. 
Teletren (2002), a children’s coaster. 
Ciclón (1987), closed and removed at 2006; replaced by Disko in 2007. 
Ghibli (1984), another children’s roller coaster. 
Bumeran (2012), a Vekoma Boomerang roller coaster. 
Torbellino (2018), a Zamperla wild mouse roller coaster.
 
Beside the steel coasters, there are three water coasters; 
Splash Caribe (‘Caribbean Splash’) 
Reventazón (‘Bursting’)
Pacuare 

In addition to roller coasters, this park has other attractions too, starting with the youth ones:
Disko 
Skymaster 
Torre (‘Tower’) 
Tornado 
Conchas Locas (‘Crazy Shells’) 
Carros chocones, para adultos (adult bumper cars) 
Rueda de Chicago (‘Chicago Wheel’ Ferris wheel)
Pulpo (‘Octopus’; closed in 2018)

Family rides are present in this park:
Electrónicos (arcade)
Tren Pachuco (train that goes all around the park)

There are mainly a lot of kiddie attractions, located at the Plaza Tio Conejo (‘Uncle Rabbit’s Plaza’, a themed area for kids).

References

External links

Amusement parks in Costa Rica
Buildings and structures in San José, Costa Rica
Child-related organizations in Costa Rica
Tourist attractions in San José, Costa Rica
Amusement parks opened in 1964